The Saudi passport is a passport document issued to citizens of Saudi Arabia for international travel. It is valid for five or ten lunar years.

Passport issuance procedures
An applicant is required to fill in an online form for the first time. In the case of passport renewal, an applicant is not required to fill in the form where the passport can be renewed with a few online steps through Absher online platform. An applicant must have a valid Government ID to be able to issue the passport. The passport photo must be taken whilst the applicant is in Saudi dress,  The photo must be  in size. The applicant must fill the form in both Arabic and English.

In 2017, a new option of the passport issuance was introduced, the new option offers a validity of ten years.

On 10 February 2022, the Saudi Ministry of Interior has announced that they have begun issuing a new passport, with a couple of changes, most notably the addition of a biometric chip.

All procedures are carried out electronically through the platform Absher. This platform enables applicants to apply for a new passport or passport renewal without the requirement of attendance in person.

New edition 
In 2022, the Ministry of Interior has announced the new version of the Saudi Passport, containing a myriad of differences, including but not limited to:

 A darker green cover page
 The addition of an electronic chip
 New data page, with multiple security features

Physical appearance 
The current Saudi passport is green , with the Emblem of Saudi Arabia emblazoned in the top of the front cover."" "Kingdom of Saudi Arabia" is written below the emblem.  Toward the bottom of the cover are inscribed "" "Passport" and, below it, the international e-passport symbol.

Identity information page

The Saudi passport includes the following data:

 Photo of passport holder 
 Type (of document, which is P for "personal")
 Country Code (listed as SAU for "Saudi Arabia")
 Passport No.
 Name 
 Nationality (Saudi Arabia)
 Sex
 Date of birth (in Islamic and Gregorian calendars)
 Date of issue (in Islamic and Gregorian calendars)
 Date of expiry (in Islamic and Gregorian calendars)
 Issuing Authority

The information page ends with the machine readable zone.

Passport note
The passports contain inside the front cover a note that is addressed to the authorities of all countries and territories, identifying the bearer as a citizen of Saudi Arabia and requesting that he or she be allowed to pass and be treated according to international norms:

In Arabic:

In English:

In the name of the King, of the Kingdom of Saudi Arabia, I request all whom it may concern to permit the bearer of this passport to pass freely, and to afford the bearer such assistance and protection required.

Languages
The passport is printed in English and in Arabic

Visa requirements

As of August 2018, Saudi citizens had visa-free or visa on arrival access to 75 countries and territories, ranking the Saudi passport 67th in terms of travel freedom according to the Henley Passport Index. Saudi citizens do not need a visa to enter other GCC states and reside permanently. From June 2017 until 2021, Saudi Arabia suspended diplomatic relations with Qatar, which is one of the GCC countries, and as a result, Saudi citizens were prohibited from traveling to the neighboring country.

See also

Visa requirements for Saudi citizens
Saudi Arabian National ID Card

References

Passports by country
Government of Saudi Arabia